The House of Habib is a Pakistani conglomerate company based in Karachi, Pakistan. The group was founded by Habib Esmail in Bombay (British Raj) in 1841.

It is a prominent shia Khoja business family in Pakistan.

History
The company has history going back to 19th century, when it started as Khoja Mithabhai Nathoo in 1841 based in then Bombay as a family business. In 1891, a family member named Habib Esmail helped the company to expand. From this, company became a major trading firm. In 1921, his four sons joined the business when he established Habib & Sons which went on to become today's HBL Pakistan or Habib Bank Limited.

The House of Habib holds an important place in Pakistan's early history. Habib Bank was shifted to Pakistan on the personal request of its first Governor General Mohammad Ali Jinnah. Mohammad Ali Habib came to the aid of the nascent state "even before the Government of Pakistan was ready to issue appropriate government paper" with a Rs 80 million loan when the Reserve Bank of India failed to deliver Pakistan share of Rs 900 million held by it. It is said that Mohammad Ali Habib gave a blank cheque on Lloyds Bank to Governor General Jinnah who wrote Rs 80 million in it.

The Habib family set up offices in Vienna and Geneva as early as 1912 and incorporated Habib and Sons in 1921, which dealt in brass, metal scraps and gold with Lion of Ali and Zulfiqar embossed on it. The Habib Bank still used this as its insignia for a large part of its history. The house is run by the Rafiq Habib family and is not jointly with the Dawood Habib family, who, however, runs the Dawood Habib Group of Companies.

Sons of Habib Esmail 
 Ahmed Habib
 Dawood Habib
 Mohamedali Habib
 Ghulamali Habib

Sons of Mahomedali Habib 

 Rafiq Habib
 Suleman Habib
 Haider Habib
 H.M. Habib

Companies 
The group owns following companies:

Listed
 Toyota Indus
 Agriauto Industries Limited
 AuVitronics Limited
 Thal Limited
 Shabbir Tiles & Ceramics Limited
 Habib Insurance Company Limited
 Habib Metropolitan Bank a subsidiary of Habib Bank AG Zurich

Unlisted
 Thal Boshoku Pakistan (Private) Limited
 Thal Engineering
 Habib Metro Pakistan (Private) Limited
 Agriauto Stamping Company (Private) Limited
 Thal Nova Power Thar (Private) Limited

Educational institutes
 Habib Public School
 Habib University

See Also
List of largest companies in Pakistan

References

External links
House of Habib website
Habib Bank AG Zurich
Habib Metropolitan Bank

 
Conglomerate companies of Pakistan
Habib
Pakistani Ismailis
Indian companies established in 1841
1841 establishments in British India
Companies based in Karachi